Heishui County is a county in the north of Sichuan Province, China. It is under the administration of the Ngawa Tibetan and Qiang Autonomous Prefecture. As of 2016, the county has a population of 61,744.

Administrative divisions 
Heishui County has jurisdiction over three towns and 14 townships:
 Luhua Town (芦花镇)
 Kalong Town (卡龙镇)
 Se'ergu Town (色尔古镇)
 Shashiduo Township (沙石多乡)
 Mawo Township (麻窝乡)
 Hongyan Township (红岩乡)
 Shuangliusuo Township (双溜索乡)
 Weigu Township (维古乡)
 Musu Township (木苏乡)
 Luoduo Township (洛多乡)
 Longba Township (龙坝乡)
 Shidiaolou Township (石碉楼乡)
 Wabo Township (瓦钵乡)
 Zhimulin Township (知木林乡)
 Ciba Township (慈坝乡)
 Zhawo Township (扎窝乡)
 Qinglang Township (晴朗乡)

Climate

References 

Ngawa Tibetan and Qiang Autonomous Prefecture
County-level divisions of Sichuan